Donemana Cricket Club is a cricket club in Donemana, County Tyrone, Northern Ireland, playing in North West Senior League 1.

The club was founded in 1888 and won its first league title in 1948, holding on to the championship until 1955. It won nine league titles in a row between 1985 and 1993.

Honours
Irish Senior Cup: 1
2000
Ulster Cup: 1
2004
North West Senior League: 31
1948, 1949, 1950, 1951, 1952, 1960, 1963, 1965, 1967, 1969, 1974, 1977, 1979, 1980, 1981, 1982, 1985, 1986, 1987, 1988, 1989, 1990, 1991, 1992, 1993, 2003, 2005, 2008, 2012, 2016, 2017
North West Senior Cup: 23
1950, 1958, 1963, 1964, 1967, 1969, 1974, 1976, 1981, 1985, 1988, 1989, 1992, 2001, 2004, 2009, 2012, 2013, 2014, 2015, 2016, 2017, 2020

References

External links

Cricket clubs in Northern Ireland
North West Senior League members
1888 establishments in Ireland
Cricket clubs in County Tyrone